Fakhruddin Ali Ahmed, the fifth President of India, died in office of heart failure on 11 February 1977, aged 71.

Background and death
On 6 February 1977, Ahmed left India for state visits to Malaysia, the Philippines and Burma. On 6 February, he arrived in Kuala Lumpur, but after two days of engagements felt fatigued and was examined by his physician, following which he cancelled his engagements and the remainder of the trip. He returned to Delhi on 10 February, and the following morning at 6:00 suffered a heart attack in his bathroom at Rashtrapati Bhavan, being declared dead at 8:52.

Funeral
Ahmed's body lay in state at Rashtrapati Bhavan until 10:00 on 13 February, after which it was taken to the Mughal Gardens adjoining the presidential residence for the Salat al-Janazah. After the prayer, Ahmed's body returned to Rashtrapati Bhavan until 14:15 when it was placed on a ceremonial gun carriage and taken in procession to the gravesite at the Jama Masjid. The funeral procession of vehicles, including acting President B. D. Jatti, Prime Minister Indira Gandhi, military units and foreign dignitaries, moved along Rajpath, Janpath, Connaught Place and Parliament Street before reaching Patel Chowk, with large numbers of mourners watching. From Patel Chowk, the procession continued along Ashoka Marg, Pt. Pant Marg and Talkatora Marg to the Parliament House complex. There, the acting President and the principal mourners left their vehicles to walk with the gun carriage past Transport Bhavan to the burial site.

Carried by military pallbearers and accompanied by the three armed service chiefs, Ahmed's body was carried to its gravesite and lowered into the grave with full state honours at around 16:30, accompanied by the Fatiha. The principal mourners and representatives of Islamic nations joined in throwing earth onto Ahmed's coffin as it was lowered into the grave. The funeral service concluded at 17:15, after a 21-gun salute was fired and the Last Post and Rouse were sounded.

Dignitaries
26 countries sent representatives to Ahmed's state funeral:

Governmental representatives

Personal representatives

References

1977 in India
State funerals in India]
Funerals by person
Deaths by person in India